Second-seeded Tommy Robredo was the defending champion, but first-seeded Nikolay Davydenko defeated him 6–3, 6–3, in the final.

Seeds

Draw

Finals

Top half

Bottom half

External links
 Draw
 Qualifying draw

Singles
Orange Warsaw Open
Oran